Falguni (meaning "of Falgun") is a Bengali given name that may refer to
Falguni Hamid, Bangladeshi actress, playwright, director and producer
Falguni Pathak (born 1964), Indian singer, performing artist, and composer
Falguni Rahman Jolly (born 1996), Bangladeshi film actress and model
Falguni Roy (1945–1981), Bengali poet

Bengali names